Kesarina Kamala (Kannada: ಕೆಸರಿನ ಕಮಲ, English: Lotus of Mud) is a 1973 Indian Kannada drama movie, directed by R. N. Jayagopal and produced by T. N. Narasimhan. The film stars Kalpana, Shringar Nagaraj and Uma Shivakumar in the lead roles. The film has musical score by Vijaya Bhaskar, who introduced Vani Jairam to Kannada Film Industry through this movie.

Cast

Kalpana
Shringar Nagaraj
Uma Shivakumar
 Sharapanjara Iyengar
 Surekha
 M. Jayashree
 Sampath in a cameo
 Shakti Prasad in a cameo
 Jayakumar
 Dore
 Master Raviprashant
 B. Kamalamma
 Sudha
 Suseela
 Arundhati
 Kusuma
 Indrani
 Rathnamma 
 Chitra Ramesh
 Lakshmi
 Rajeshwari
 Komala
 Prema
 B. Hanumathachar
 Siddhalingappa
 H. Krishna Sastry
 Vijayasarathi
 Padmanabhan
 P. S. Mani

Soundtrack
The Soundtrack of the film was composed by Vijaya Bhaskar, with lyrics penned by R. N. Jayagopal

Track list

References

External links
 
 

1973 films
1970s Kannada-language films